Operation Acolyte was the name given to the Australian Defence Force's (ADF) contribution to providing security, ceremonial and general support to the 2006 Commonwealth Games held in Melbourne, Australia. The ADF contributed approximately 2600 personnel to Operation Acolyte from across the three defence services (Army, Navy, Air Force), and was commanded by Brigadier Andrew Smith.

References

Further reading

 
 

Acolyte
2006 Commonwealth Games